This is an index of lists of weapons.

By time period
List of medieval weapons
List of premodern combat weapons
List of American Civil War weapons
List of World War I weapons
List of World War II weapons
List of Korean War weapons
List of Vietnam War weapons
List of 20th-century weapons

By type
List of anti-aircraft weapons
List of aircraft weapons
List of artillery
List of firearms
List of assault rifles
List of battle rifles
List of blow forward firearms
List of bolt-action rifles
List of bullpup firearms
List of carbines
List of delayed blowback firearms
List of grenade launchers
List of machine guns
List of multiple-barrel firearms
List of pistols
List of recoilless rifles
List of revolvers
List of rifles
List of rocket launchers
List of semi-automatic pistols
List of semi-automatic rifles
List of shotguns
List of sniper rifles
List of submachine guns
List of flamethrowers
List of magical weapons
List of martial arts weapons
List of missiles
List of mythological weapons
List of practice weapons
List of rockets
Lists of swords
List of types of spears
List of torpedoes

By country
List of artillery by country
List of individual weapons of the U.S. Armed Forces
List of service rifles of national armies
List of weapons of the U.S. Marine Corps

Weapons-related
List of aircraft
List of armoured fighting vehicles
List of chemical warfare agents
List of handgun cartridges
List of rifle cartridges

See also
Weapon